Jake Knott (born October 24, 1990) is a former American football linebacker. He was signed by the Philadelphia Eagles as an undrafted free agent in 2013. He played college football at Iowa State.

High school
Knott attended Waukee High School in Waukee, IA where he was a three-sport athlete (Football, Track, Baseball), earning all-state honors in each sport. Knott was being recruited for both football and baseball, and was listed on Rivals as a two star outside linebacker as well as the 9th best recruit in the state of Iowa. After receiving offers from numerous smaller schools, he was offered a scholarship from Iowa State. He was reportedly the first commitment under first year coach, Paul Rhoads in 2009.

Professional career

Philadelphia Eagles
On April 27, 2013, Knott signed with the Philadelphia Eagles after going unselected in the 2013 NFL Draft. Knott recorded a tackle and recovered an onside kick in his first NFL game.

It was announced on April 4, 2014, that he would be suspended for the first four games of the 2014 season for testing positive for performance-enhancing drugs. He was released on August 23, 2014.

Knott was re-signed to the Eagles practice squad on October 1, 2014 but was waived with an injury settlement on October 3, 2014.

Miami Dolphins
On December 9, 2014, he was signed by the Miami Dolphins, but was waived on June 5, 2015.

References

External links
Philadelphia Eagles bio
Iowa State Cyclones bio

1990 births
Living people
Players of American football from Kansas City, Missouri
American football linebackers
Iowa State Cyclones football players
Philadelphia Eagles players
People from Waukee, Iowa
Miami Dolphins players